United Nations Security Council resolution 1597, adopted unanimously on 20 April 2005, after recalling resolutions 827 (1993), 1166 (1998), 1329 (2003), 1411 (2002), 1431 (2002), 1481 (2003), 1503 (2003) and 1534 (2004), the Council amended the statute of the International Criminal Tribunal for the former Yugoslavia (ICTY) in order to allow temporary judges to be re-elected.

The Security Council had received a new list of candidates for temporary judges at the ICTY, and the deadline for nominations had been extended until 31 March 2005, with the Secretary-General requesting a further extension. 27 judges elected by the General Assembly whose terms were to expire on 11 June 2005 were able to be re-elected and, acting under Chapter VII of the United Nations Charter, the statute was amended accordingly.

See also
 List of United Nations Security Council Resolutions 1501 to 1600 (2003–2005)
 Yugoslav Wars

References

External links
 
Text of the Resolution at undocs.org

 1597
2005 in Bosnia and Herzegovina
 1597
April 2005 events